The Oakland Athletics' 1999 season involved the A's finishing 2nd in the American League West with a record of 87 wins and 75 losses. In doing so, the Athletics finished with their first winning record since 1992. The campaign was also the first of eight consecutive winning seasons for the Athletics (the last of these coming in 2006).

Offseason
 December 14, 1998: Tony Phillips was signed as a free agent by the Athletics.
December 14, 1998: Rafael Bournigal was released by the Oakland Athletics.
 January 7, 1999: Marc Newfield was signed as a free agent by the Athletics.
January 8, 1999: Mike Oquist was signed as a free agent with the Oakland Athletics.
 January 26, 1999: Tim Raines was signed as a free agent by the Athletics.
 February 17, 1999: John Jaha signed as a free agent by the Athletics.

Regular season

Season standings

Record vs. opponents

Notable transactions
 July 23, 1999: Kenny Rogers was traded by the Athletics to the New York Mets for Terrence Long and Leo Vasquez.
 July 29, 1999: Jeff Davanon, Nathan Haynes, and Elvin Nina (minors) were traded by the Athletics to the Anaheim Angels for Randy Velarde and Omar Olivares.
 July 31, 1999: Billy Taylor was traded by the Athletics to the New York Mets for Jason Isringhausen and Greg McMichael.
 July 31, 1999: Jeff D'Amico, Brad Rigby and Blake Stein were traded by the Athletics to the Kansas City Royals for Kevin Appier.
August 18, 1999: Rich Becker was traded by the Milwaukee Brewers to the Oakland Athletics for a player to be named later. The Oakland Athletics sent Carl Dale (August 20, 1999) to the Milwaukee Brewers to complete the trade.

Roster

Player stats

Batting

Starters by position
Note: Pos = Position; G = Games played; AB = At bats; H = Hits; Avg. = Batting average; HR = Home runs; RBI = Runs batted in

Other batters
Note: G = Games played; AB = At bats; H = Hits; Avg. = Batting average; HR = Home runs; RBI = Runs batted in

Pitching

Starting pitchers
Note: G = Games pitched; IP = Innings pitched; W = Wins; L = Losses; ERA = Earned run average; SO = Strikeouts

Other pitchers
Note: G = Games pitched; IP = Innings pitched; W = Wins; L = Losses; ERA = Earned run average; SO = Strikeouts

Relief pitchers
Note: G = Games pitched; W = Wins; L = Losses; SV = Saves; ERA = Earned run average; SO = Strikeouts

Farm system 

LEAGUE CHAMPIONS: Vancouver, AZL Athletics

References

1999 Oakland Athletics team page at Baseball Reference
1999 Oakland Athletics team page at www.baseball-almanac.com

Oakland Athletics seasons
Oak
Oakland